Jennifer Lyun Skogerboe (born June 8, 1992) is an American soccer player.

College career
Skogerboe played 70 matches and scored seven goals for the University of Connecticut, playing most as a centre midfielder.

Club career
While still at University of Connecticut, Skogerboe played for D.C. United Women and Washington Spirit Reserves at W-League. Spending three seasons in the league. From 2012 to 2015. She also played two matches with the Spirit core team, between 2014 and 2015. After the 2015 season Skogerboe went overseas and signed with 1. FC Slovácko of Czech First Division. With the czech team, she started 10 matches and helped the team to reach a third place in the league in the 2015–2016 season.

On July 1, 2016 she signed with Portland Thorns FC. Head coach Mark Parsons praised her, stating: "Jen is a technically smooth player, who has good tactical awareness. The most important thing for us in this period is having players that are versatile, and Jen is capable of helping us in multiple positions".

After the 2016 season, the Thorns did not extend Skogerboe's 2017 contract option and she signed with Suwon FMC of the WK League in South Korea.

Personal life
Skogerboe was born in Yokosuka, Kanagawa, Japan. Her father was a Captain in the Navy, so her family used to travel frequently. They settled in several places, including Singapore, Seattle and Washington D.C.

References

External links
 Player's Profile at University of Connecticut 
 Player's Profile at Soccer Punter
 
 Player's Profile at Portland Thorns

1992 births
Living people
Washington Spirit players
Portland Thorns FC players
UConn Huskies women's soccer players
American women's soccer players
1. FC Slovácko (women) players
Expatriate women's footballers in the Czech Republic
People from Yokosuka, Kanagawa
American sportspeople of Japanese descent
Suwon FC Women players
Expatriate women's footballers in South Korea
American expatriate sportspeople in the Czech Republic
American expatriate sportspeople in South Korea
National Women's Soccer League players
Women's association football defenders
Women's association football midfielders
Czech Women's First League players

People from Ashburn, Virginia
Ottawa Fury (women) players
USL W-League (1995–2015) players